Leopoldo Jacinto Luque ((3 May 1949 – 15 February 2021) was an Argentine footballer who played as a striker.

Club career
In a career spanning from 1972 to 1984 he played for Unión de Santa Fe, Rosario Central, River Plate, Racing Club de Avellaneda and Chacarita Juniors.

On 22 February 1976, Luque scored all five goals in a game in which his team, River Plate, defeated San Lorenzo de Almagro 5–1.

International career
With Argentina he was 1978 World Champion, scoring four goals in the tournament, including a spectacular long distance volley against France during the first round. During that tournament, his brother died in a traffic accident on the day that Argentina played Italy. He also seriously injured his left elbow in the match against France, the second game of that championship, forcing him to miss two matches. He was back for the last three matches of the tournament, including the final against the Netherlands.

Later life and death
Luque was sports secretary of Mendoza Province.

In February 2007, Luque suffered a heart attack from which he recovered. He died from covid 19 on 15 February 2021, during the COVID-19 pandemic in Argentina.

Career statistics

Club

FIFA World Cup statistics

International goals
Scores and results list Argentina's goal tally first, score column indicates score after each Luque goal.

Honours

Club
River Plate
Primera División: 1975 Nacional, 1977 Metropolitano, 1979 Metropolitano, 1979 Nacional, 1980 Metropolitano

International
Argentina
FIFA World Cup: 1978

Individual
Copa América Top Scorer: 1975

References

External links

 
 

1949 births
2021 deaths
Footballers from Santa Fe, Argentina
Argentine footballers
Association football forwards
Gimnasia y Esgrima de Jujuy footballers
Unión de Santa Fe footballers
Rosario Central footballers
Club Atlético River Plate footballers
Racing Club de Avellaneda footballers
Santos FC players
Chacarita Juniors footballers
Deportivo Mandiyú footballers
Argentine Primera División players
Liga MX players
Argentina international footballers
1978 FIFA World Cup players
1975 Copa América players
FIFA World Cup-winning players
Deaths from the COVID-19 pandemic in Argentina
Argentine expatriate footballers
Argentine expatriate sportspeople in Mexico
Expatriate footballers in Mexico
Argentine expatriate sportspeople in Brazil
Expatriate footballers in Brazil
Unión de Santa Fe managers